Skrautvål is a village in Nord-Aurdal Municipality in Innlandet county, Norway. Skrautvål Church is located in the village. 

The local sports team is Skrautvål IL, of which Inger Helene Nybråten is the most prominent member. Also, Olav Meisdalshagen grew up just north of Skrautvål.

References

Nord-Aurdal
Villages in Innlandet